Joel Nathaniel Campbell Samuels (born 26 June 1992) is a Costa Rican professional footballer who plays as a forward and winger for Liga MX club León and the Costa Rica national team.

Campbell joined Arsenal in 2011 and was thereafter loaned out to French side Lorient, Spanish club Real Betis and Greek outfit Olympiacos. He made his competitive Arsenal debut as the club won the 2014 FA Community Shield. He was again sent on loan to La Liga team Villarreal before he scored his first Arsenal goal in 2015.

Campbell has so far earned over 120 caps for Costa Rica and was a member of the squad which won the 2014 Copa Centroamericana. He was also part of the Costa Rican side which reached the last eight of the 2014 FIFA World Cup, and played in the 2018 and 2022 World Cup as well. Campbell additionally helped Costa Rica get to the quarter-finals of the 2015, 2019 and 2021 CONCACAF Gold Cups, as well as the semi-finals of the 2017 Gold Cup.

Club career

Saprissa
Campbell's career began with Saprissa in 2009 before being sent on loan to Puntarenas in January 2011.

On 28 July 2011, Costa Rican television reported that Campbell had come to an agreement with Arsenal, after having been discovered by club scout Danny Karbassiyoon. Campbell later said that while he had not yet signed, talks were taking place. On 6 August, Costa Rican media reported that Campbell was set to sign a five-year deal with Arsenal after rejecting moves to Sevilla and Fiorentina. According to Campbell, he was also approached by Manchester United's Alex Ferguson, who wanted to bring him under Ryan Giggs' mentorship.

Arsenal
On 19 August 2011, Arsenal confirmed that they had signed Campbell, but it was reported eight days later that he had failed to obtain a work permit to enable him to play in England. Campbell finally received that permit in July 2013.

Loan to Lorient
Unable to get a work permit in England, Campbell along with Gilles Sunu both joined French club Lorient, with Campbell moving on loan and Sunu on a permanent transfer. He made his debut for Lorient as a 79th-minute substitute for Grégory Bourillon in the 1–1 draw away to Sochaux, and created the assist for Innocent Emeghara to score and earn Lorient an away point. On 1 October, he scored his first goal for Lorient against Valenciennes in the 2–0 win, Campbell's right-footed shot found the bottom left hand corner of the goal. On 26 October, Campbell scored his second goal for Lorient in a Coupe de la Ligue match against Montpellier. He scored his third goal also against Montpellier in a 2–1 win which proved to be the winner.

Loan to Real Betis
On 6 July 2012, Campbell joined La Liga side Real Betis on a season-long loan. He made his debut on 25 August, coming on as a substitute for Salvador Agra to play the last 20 minutes in their 2–1 home defeat to Rayo Vallecano.

Campbell played 28 league matches and scored two goals; his first was on 2 December, to give Betis a 3–2 away win against Deportivo de La Coruña, and his second came in the seventh minute of a 2–0 home victory against Levante on 13 January.

Loan to Olympiacos
By summer 2013, Campbell had been granted a work permit in England but he joined Greek side Olympiacos on another one-year loan.

On 27 October 2013, Campbell starred in Olympiacos' win over OFI Crete, picking up four assists to help his side win 5–1. Campbell impressed again on 10 November, scoring once and earning two assists as Olympiacos thrashed PAOK 4–0.

On 25 February 2014, Campbell scored the second goal Olympiacos' 2–0 win over Manchester United in the last 16 of the UEFA Champions League. Olympiacos, however, did not proceed to the next round after losing 3–0 in the second leg.

Return to Arsenal
Arsenal manager Arsène Wenger announced that Campbell would be part of his first team plans for Arsenal's 2014–15 season. On 2 August 2014, Campbell scored in Arsenal's 5–1 win over Benfica in the Emirates Cup. Eight days later in the 2014 FA Community Shield, he replaced Aaron Ramsey for the final five minutes of the 3–0 win over Manchester City at Wembley Stadium. He made his Premier League debut on 23 August in a 2–2 draw against Everton at Goodison Park, coming off the bench to replace Alex Oxlade-Chamberlain on the 74th minute of the match.

Campbell's first Arsenal start came in the third round of the League Cup on 23 September, lining up in attack with Alexis Sánchez and Lukas Podolski in a 1–2 home defeat against Southampton. BBC Sport described Campbell and Podolski as "largely anonymous" during the match.

During an April 2020 interview for TD Más, Campbell recalled his frustration during this time, revealing that Arsenal had declined an offer by Benfica to sign him, because "they [Arsenal] told me they needed me because Giroud was injured," but Arsenal nonetheless decided to sign Danny Welbeck.

Loan to Villarreal
On 24 January 2015, Villarreal announced the signing of Campbell on loan until the end of the season. On 10 May, he scored his first goal for the team, the only goal in a victory over fellow Valencians Elche, which secured sixth place for The Yellow Submarine in La Liga and entry into the following season's UEFA Europa League.

2015–16 season
After returning from his loan at Villarreal, Campbell started his first game of the season in a 2–1 win against Tottenham Hotspur in the League Cup third round on 23 September 2015. On 31 October, due to injuries to Theo Walcott and Alex Oxlade-Chamberlain, Campbell made his first Premier League start for the club against Swansea City at the Liberty Stadium, scoring his first competitive goal in a 3–0 win. Having scored his first Premier League goal, Campbell scored his first Emirates Stadium goal against Sunderland on 6 December, the first for Arsenal in a 3–1 win. The sides faced at the Emirates again in the FA Cup third round on 9 January 2016, with Campbell again scoring Arsenal's first as they matched the scoreline they achieved just over a month earlier.

Campbell recounted that he had lost regularity at Arsenal after a 1–2 defeat to Watford. Campbell, "with tears in [his] eyes out of helplessness," asked Arsène Wenger about this situation, to which Wenger replied "I noticed you were tired;" but despite Campbell's desire to play, he remained irregular during the season. Frustrated, Campbell requested a new loan.

Loan to Sporting CP
On 28 July, in the 2016 MLS All-Star Game in San Jose, California, Campbell won an early penalty when fouled by Laurent Ciman, and took it himself to open a 2–1 victory. On 21 August 2016, Portuguese Primeira Liga side Sporting CP signed Campbell on loan until the end of the season.

Second loan spell with Real Betis
Campbell joined Real Betis on loan for a second time on 31 August 2017.
He went on to pick up an injury in a game against Espanyol in late October 2017. This put him out of action for another three months. Campbell sought to make a comeback to the club's training squad in late January 2018.

Frosinone
On 17 August 2018, Campbell signed a three-year contract with Frosinone.

Loan to Club León
In January 2019, he was loaned out to León for 18 months after failing to score in 17 games.

Loan to C.F. Monterrey
In 2021, Campbell was loaned out to C.F. Monterrey.

International career

Campbell was selected for Costa Rica's squad for the 2009 CONCACAF U-17 Championship. He was the team's highest scorer, although he had only two goals in total. That same year, he participated in the 2009 FIFA U-17 World Cup held in Nigeria. He was named in the 2011 CONCACAF U-20 Championship two years later and tied for top scorer with six goals.

Campbell was first called up to the senior team in March 2011, for friendlies with PR China and Argentina. He would juggle cans on the streets of San José. Before the friendlies, he was spotted doing this by national team manager Ricardo La Volpe. In announcing Campbell's inclusion in the squad, La Volpe said, "Who is Messi? Who is Neymar? Gentlemen of the press – I present to you: Campbell. I discovered him playing with cans."

Campbell was called up for the 2011 CONCACAF Gold Cup in the United States. In their group opener on 5 June at Cowboys Stadium, he replaced Marco Ureña in the 56th minute and a quarter of an hour later volleyed a goal to conclude a 5–0 win over Cuba. In the quarter-finals at the MetLife Stadium, he again came on for Ureña in the second half of extra time; the game went to a penalty shootout in which Campbell netted his attempt but Honduras advanced 4–2.

Campbell was part of Costa Rica's squad when they were invited to the 2011 Copa América in Argentina, and started all of their games as they came third in Group A and were eliminated. In their second group game, on 7 July at the Estadio 23 de Agosto in Jujuy, he concluded a 2–0 win over Bolivia after being set up by Heiner Mora, and was also fouled for Wálter Flores' red card.

In September 2013, Campbell became the subject of controversy when video emerged of his off-the-ball dive against the United States' Matt Besler in a World Cup qualifying match. Besler received a yellow card and was suspended. The footage generated discussion of the quality of CONCACAF refereeing, and whether such cheating should be eligible for post-match disciplinary action. Campbell's dive was described as "pathetic", "cynical" and "disgraceful". On 13 September, the Costa Rican media reported that FIFA were investigating Campbell over the incident, although nothing came of the investigation. On 4 October, FIFA officially reprimanded Campbell for unsporting behaviour.

On 14 June 2014, Campbell scored Costa Rica's first goal in the 2014 FIFA World Cup, equalising against Uruguay in an eventual 3–1 victory. His pass to Marco Ureña also set up Costa Rica's third goal in the game. During the round of 16, Campbell was the fourth of five Costa Rican players to successfully convert his kick in a 5–3 penalty shootout victory over Greece.

Campbell was again called up to Costa Rica's squad for the Gold Cup of 2017.

In May 2018 he was named in Costa Rica’s 23-man squad for the 2018 FIFA World Cup in Russia.

Personal life
Joel Campbell is the son of Humberto Campbell and Roxana Samuels and is of Jamaican descent. He is in a relationship with Maria Fernanda Cascante. He has three siblings by the names of Nekisha, Humberto and Katherine. Campbell is a devout Christian. He says that family is the second pillar in his life, with the first being God. Campbell also recites Psalm 27 before every game.

Career statistics

Club

International

Scores and results list Costa Rica's goal tally first, score column indicates score after each Campbell goal.

Honours

Olympiacos
Super League Greece: 2013–14

Arsenal
FA Community Shield: 2014

León
Liga MX: Guardianes 2020

Costa Rica
Copa Centroamericana: 2014

Individual
CONCACAF U-20 Championship Top scorer: 2011
Super League Greece Team of the Year: 2013–14
CONCACAF Best XI: 2015

See also 
 List of men's footballers with 100 or more international caps

References

External links

Sports by Campbell – Joel Campbell's media site

1992 births
Living people
Costa Rican people of Jamaican descent
Costa Rican Christians
Footballers from San José, Costa Rica
Costa Rican footballers
Association football forwards
Deportivo Saprissa players
Puntarenas F.C. players
Arsenal F.C. players
FC Lorient players
Real Betis players
Olympiacos F.C. players
Villarreal CF players
Sporting CP footballers
Frosinone Calcio players
Club León footballers
Liga FPD players
Ligue 1 players
La Liga players
Super League Greece players
Premier League players
Primeira Liga players
Serie A players
Liga MX players
Costa Rica under-20 international footballers
Costa Rica international footballers
2011 CONCACAF U-20 Championship players
2011 CONCACAF Gold Cup players
2011 Copa América players
2014 FIFA World Cup players
2014 Copa Centroamericana players
2015 CONCACAF Gold Cup players
Copa América Centenario players
2017 CONCACAF Gold Cup players
2018 FIFA World Cup players
2019 CONCACAF Gold Cup players
2021 CONCACAF Gold Cup players
2022 FIFA World Cup players
Copa Centroamericana-winning players
Costa Rican expatriate footballers
Expatriate footballers in England
Expatriate footballers in France
Expatriate footballers in Spain
Expatriate footballers in Greece
Expatriate footballers in Portugal
Expatriate footballers in Italy
Expatriate footballers in Mexico
Costa Rican expatriate sportspeople in England
Costa Rican expatriate sportspeople in France
Costa Rican expatriate sportspeople in Spain
Costa Rican expatriate sportspeople in Greece
Costa Rican expatriate sportspeople in Portugal
Costa Rican expatriate sportspeople in Italy
Costa Rican expatriate sportspeople in Mexico
Costa Rica youth international footballers
FIFA Century Club